Asbury Farnham Haynes (September 4, 1842 – July 8, 1931) was a Union Army soldier in the American Civil War who received the U.S. military's highest decoration, the Medal of Honor.

He was awarded the Medal of Honor for extraordinary heroism shown on April 6, 1865, during the Battle of Sailor's Creek, where he captured the colors of the 21st North Carolina in Lewis' Brigade, Walker's Division, of Gordon's 2nd Corps, while serving as a corporal with Company F, 17th Maine Volunteer Infantry.

Hawthorne moved to the state of Washington after the war and died there aged 88 on July 8, 1931. He was buried at Lake View Cemetery, Seattle.

Medal of Honor citation

Notes

References 

 
 .

External links
 

1842 births
1931 deaths
United States Army Medal of Honor recipients
American Civil War recipients of the Medal of Honor